Dominik Bury  (born 29 November 1996) is a Polish cross-country skier who competes internationally.
 
He represented Poland at the 2018 Winter Olympics.

His brother Kamil is also a skier.

Cross-country skiing results
All results are sourced from the International Ski Federation (FIS).

Olympic Games

Distance reduced to 30 km due to weather conditions.

World Championships

World Cup

Season standings

References

External links

1996 births
Living people
Polish male cross-country skiers
Tour de Ski skiers
Olympic cross-country skiers of Poland
Cross-country skiers at the 2018 Winter Olympics
Cross-country skiers at the 2022 Winter Olympics
People from Cieszyn